or smallpox devil is a demon which was believed to be responsible for causing smallpox in medieval Japan. In those days, people tried to appease the smallpox demon by assuaging his anger, or they tried to attack the demon since they had no other effective treatment for smallpox.

History
In Japanese, the word hōsōshin or hōsōgami (疱瘡神 (ほうそうしん, ほうそうがみ）) translates literally to "smallpox god". According to the Shoku Nihongi, smallpox was introduced into Japan in 735 into the Fukuoka Prefecture from Korea.  In those days, smallpox had been considered to be the result of onryō, which was a mythological spirit from Japanese folklore who is able to return to the physical world in order to seek vengeance. Smallpox-related kami include Sumiyoshi sanjin. In a book published in the Kansei years (1789–1801), there were lines that wrote that smallpox devils were enshrined in families which had smallpox in order to recover from smallpox.

Smallpox devils were said to be afraid of red things and also of dogs; thus people displayed various dolls that were red. In Okinawa, they tried to praise and comfort devils with sanshin, an Okinawan musical instrument, and lion dances before a patient clad in red clothes. They offered flowers and burned incense in order to please smallpox demon. In Okinawa, there was smallpox poetry in Ryuka; the purpose of smallpox poetry in the Ryukyu language is the glorification of the smallpox demon, or improvement from deadly infection of smallpox. There is a collection of smallpox poetry including 105 poems published in 1805. Traditional smallpox folk dances have been observed even in present-day Japan, including Ibaraki Prefecture and Kagoshima Prefecture, for the avoidance of smallpox devils.

Red treatment
In European countries the "red treatment" was practiced from the 12th century onwards; when he caught smallpox, King Charles V of France was dressed in a red shirt, red stockings, and a red veil. Queen Elizabeth I of England was likewise wrapped in a red blanket and placed by a live fire when she fell ill with smallpox in 1562, and similar treatments were applied to other European monarchs. In parts of India, China, Africa and Latin America, sacrifices were made to appease the gods of smallpox. In medieval Europe, prayer and pious living were recommended as one way to guard against sickness. Many Japanese textbooks on dermatology stated that red light was able to weaken the symptoms of smallpox. This was common in China, India, Turkey and Georgia. In western Africa, the Yoruba god of smallpox, Sopona, was associated with the color red.

The red treatment was given scientific authority by Nobel laureate Niels Ryberg Finsen, who claimed that the treatment of smallpox patients with red light reduced the severity of scarring, and later developed rules governing erythrotherapy. These beliefs lingered on into the 1930s until researchers declared it to be "useless."

References

Japanese legendary creatures
Japanese folklore
Japanese deities
Smallpox deities
Evil deities